Ameer Sachet (born 1963 in Baghdad, Iraq) is a Swedish politician of the Social Democratic Party. He has been a member of the Riksdag since 2006 and a replacement member of the Riksdag in 2002 and 2005–2006.

External links
Riksdagen: Ameer Sachet (s)

Members of the Riksdag from the Social Democrats
Iraqi emigrants to Sweden
Living people
People from Baghdad
1963 births
Date of birth missing (living people)
21st-century Swedish politicians